Corviglia is a World Cup ski course in Switzerland at St. Moritz, Grisons. Opened  in 1934, it is located in the Engadin valley on Piz Nair mountain in the Albula Alps.

Corviglia has hosted a record five World Championships (1934, 1948, 1974, 2003, 2017) and the Winter Olympics in 1948 (concurrent World Championships).

It is adjacent to the newer "Engiadina", a course used for women's speed events, which hosted those events during the two most recent World Championships (2003, 2017).

"Free Fall", a new downhill start constructed in 2003 by Bernhard Russi, has the steepest incline in circuit at 45 degrees (100% gradient).

Winter Olympics

From 1948 through 1980, the Winter Olympics were concurrent World Championships for alpine skiing.

Men's events

Women's events

World Championships
The start was at Munt da San Murezzan and the finish line at St. Moritz Bad, which was never used again. An access path had to be cut in the forest.

Men's events

Women's events

Championships from 1954 to 1980, the combined was a "paper race" using the results of the three events (DH, GS, SL).

World Cup

Men

Women
Unclear if 1999, 2000 and 2001 events were held on Corviglia or Engiadina course?

Full course sections
Frei Fall, Super-G start, Suvretta Kante, Lanigiro, Mauritius, Mauer, Weißes Band, Alp Giop, Romingersprung, Lärchensprung, Salastrains (finish area).

References

External links

FIS Alpine Ski World Cup – St. Moritz, Switzerland
Ski-db.com - St. Moritz women's races
Ski-db.com - St. Moritz men's races

Skiing in Switzerland